2008–09 FIBA EuroChallenge First Qualifying Round are the first qualifying round for the 2008–09 FIBA EuroChallenge season,  There are only 32 teams, who will play two games. The Winners go to the second qualifying round

Bracket

Results

Game B

Game C

Game D

Game E

Game F

Game H

Game N

2008–09 FIBA EuroChallenge